The Diwan u-tafsir ḏ-razia ḏ-abahata ( "Scroll and Tafsir [Explanation] of the Secrets of the Ancestors", or simply "The Secrets of the Ancestors") is a Mandaean religious text. It is written as a scroll.

Manuscripts and translations
The Bodleian Library at Oxford University holds a manuscript of the text, catalogued as Ms. Asiat. Misc. C 13. The text was translated into German by Bogdan Burtea in 2012.

Ms. Asiat. Misc. C 13 was discovered in 1956. It is a scroll that is about 32 cm wide and 257 cm long. The text contains 378 lines and occupies about 28.5 cm in width. Illustrations take up 31.5 cm of the length. The illustrated part of the manuscript is marked by frames and is divided into two parts. The upper part with banner illustrations is about 12 cm, and the lower one with anthropomorphic figures is about 18.5 cm high. The illustrations are accompanied by short explanations written in Mandaic. The figures depicted are about 7 cm in length. The manuscript is dated to the year 1238 A.H.(1822 A.D.).

Contents
The contents of the text are:

Lines 1-5: Introduction
between lines 5 and 6: illustrations with accompanying written explanations
Lines 6-157: Secret teachings/instructions of the uthri (light beings)
Lines 158-362: Interpretation of prayers and rituals
Lines 363-378: Colophon

The text lists the names of the following uthras in order:

Barmeil
Bihdad
Bihram
Šišlam
Šišlameil
Manhareil
Nureil
Zihrun
Sahqeil
Haiil
Reil

References

Mandaean texts